This is a list of national records in track cycling in Austria, maintained by the Austrian Cycling Federation (in German, Österreichischer Radsport-Verband).

Men

Women

References

External links
 ÖRV web site
 Austrian Cycling records

Austria
Records
Track cycling
track cycling